Lovelytheband (stylized in all lowercase) is an American indie pop band that formed in 2016 in Los Angeles, California, United States. The band consists of vocalist Mitchy Collins, guitarist Jordan Greenwald, and drummer Sam Price. The band is most known for their single "Broken" which charted on several US Billboard charts.

The band debuted in April 2017 with their single "Broken" which quickly earned over three million streams on Spotify. The single charted on several Billboard charts. It topped the Billboard Alternative Songs chart and Billboard Rock Airplay chart for several weeks. The single also became the band's first top 10 on the Billboard Radio Songs chart and first top 40 on the Billboard Hot 100.

In September 2017, the band released their first EP, Everything I Could Never Say.... They released the single "These Are My Friends" in May 2018. On August 3, 2018, they released their debut album Finding It Hard to Smile.

Career

2016–2018: "Broken" and Everything I Could Never Say...
Mitchy Collins, Jordan Greenwald, and Sam Price met and formed the band while at a nightclub in West Hollywood. The band then released their debut single, "Broken", in April 2017.

"Broken" appeared on several Billboard charts. It topped the Billboard Alternative Songs chart, dated April 21, 2018, and stayed on top for seven consecutive weeks. It topped the Billboard Rock Airplay chart, dated June 9, 2018, and remained on top for nine consecutive weeks. It peaked at number 10 on the Billboard Radio Songs chart (airplay chart across all genres), number 14 on the Mainstream Top 40 chart (airplay chart for pop songs), and number 29 on the Billboard Hot 100. The single became the band's first top 10 on the Billboard Radio Songs chart and first top 40 on the Hot 100. It was also one of the four songs in 2018 that managed to chart in both the Alternative Songs chart and the Top 10 of the Radio Songs chart.

After signing with Another Century Records, they released their debut EP, Everything I Could Never Say..., in September 2017. The band then toured with The Wrecks and La Bouquet.

2018–present: Finding It Hard to Smile and Conversations with Myself About You
On May 11, 2018, the band released the single "These Are My Friends" from their upcoming début album. The album, Finding It Hard to Smile, was then released on August 3, 2018.

The band went on their first headlining tour, the Broken Like Me Tour, which started on August 15, 2018. The tour visited Canada and the United States. They also toured as the opening act for the European leg of 5 Seconds of Summer's Meet You There Tour. The band then embarked on their second headlining tour, Finding It Hard to Smile Tour, to support their debut album. The tour visited cities across the US and Canada, beginning in March 2019.

On February 24, 2020, it was announced that Lovelytheband would be opening acts for Australian band 5 Seconds of Summer on the Latin America arena concert dates on their Take My Hand World Tour. Lovelytheband is set to be opening acts on three dates, starting on May 18, 2022 at the Palacio de los Deportes Arena in Mexico City, Mexico.

On July 2, 2020, the band announced their second album, Conversations with Myself About You, which was released on August 28, 2020. It includes the singles "Loneliness for Love", "Waste", "I Should Be Happy", "idwgtyp", and "Buzz Cut".

On October 30, 2020 the band released the single "Heartbreak of America" which highlighted problems in America such as gun violence, the 2020 presidential election, drug abuse, etc. The song was co-written by Foster the People frontman Mark Foster.

Discography

Albums
 Finding It Hard to Smile (2018)
 Conversations with Myself About You (2020)
 If We’re Being Honest  (2023)

Extended plays
 Everything I Could Never Say... (2017)

Singles

As lead artist

As featured artist

Promotional singles

Music videos

Members 
Mitch Collins – lead vocals, guitar
Jordan Greenwald – guitar, keyboards
Sam Price – drums, percussion

Awards and nominations

Billboard Music Awards

iHeartRadio Music Awards

Tours

Headlining act
 Broken Like Me Tour (August–October 2018) 
 Finding It Hard to Smile Tour (2019)

Supporting act
 The Wrecks – Robot Army Tour (November–December 2017) 
 Vance Joy – Nation of Two World Tour (April–May 2018) 
 AWOLNATION – Here Come The Runts Tour (June 2018) 
 5 Seconds of Summer – Meet You There Tour (October–November 2018)
 LANY World Tour (European dates only) (2019)

References

External links
 

Musical groups from Los Angeles
2016 establishments in California
Musical groups established in 2016
Another Century Records artists